Malnad (Malēnādu) is a region in the state of Karnataka in India. Malenadu covers the western and eastern slopes of the Western Ghats or Sahyadri mountain range, and is roughly 100 kilometers in width. The region experiences heavy annual rainfall of 1000 to 3800 mm; it includes Agumbe, which receives the highest annual rainfall in Karnataka (over 10,000 mm).

In Malnad area the villages are scattered to lying in remote areas. This region in the state poses special problems of development mainly due to peculiar settlement, sparse population, topography, dense forest, numerous rivulets etc. In order to hasten the development of this area, Malnad Area Development Board was created as per Malnad Area Development Act, 1991 with a view to achieve overall development of Malnad area by implementing necessary development projects/works. The districts covered initially in this region were Shivamogga, Chikmagalur, Uttara Kannada, Kodagu and Hassan. At present the jurisidiction of the board covers part or all of 13 districts of the state, namely Chamarajnagar, Belgaum, Dharwar, Davangere, Haveri, Chikmagalur, Hassan, Shivamogga, Kodagu, Mysore, Uttarkannada, Udupi, and Mangalore.

These districts comprise 65 Assembly constituencies and 61 taluks. The area of operation of the Board notified by the Karnataka government is as follows:

Belgaum	
Bailahongal, Belgaum, Hukkeri, Khanapur, Saudi 

Chamaraj nagar	
Chamarajnagar, Gundlupete, Kollegala, Hanuru

Chikkamagalur	
Kadur, Koppa, Chikkamagalur, Mudigere, Narasimharajapur, Shringeri, Tarikere, Ajjampura

Davanagere	
Channagiri, Honnali, Nyamathi

Dharwad	
Dharwad, Kalaghatagi, Alnanavara

Hassan	
Alur, Arakalagud, Belur, Hassan, Sakaleshpur

Haveri	
Hangal, Hirekerur, Rettihalli, Byadagi, Savanur, Shiggaon

Kodagu	
Madikeri, Somavarpet, Virajpet

Dakshina Kannada	
Mangalore, Puttur, Sulya, Bantwal, Belthangadi, Mudubidri, Kadaba

Mysore	
Heggadadevana kote, Hunasur, Periyapattana, Sargur

Shivamogga	
Bhadravati, Shivamogga, Sagar, Sorab, Hosanagar, Thirthahalli, Shikaripura

Udupi	
Udupi, Kundapur, Karkala, Brahmavara, Kapu, Byndoor, Hebri

Uttara kannada	
Ankola, Bhatkal, Haliyal, Honnavara, Karwar, Kumta, Mundagod, Siddapur, Sirsi, Joida, Yallapur, Dandeli

Climate and rainfall statistics
The Western Ghats act as the rain barrier during south-west monsoon season. This region is one of the wettest regions in the world, with some rainfall measurements of over 7000mm.

The following were the top 5 places that captured rainfall record statistics [2010-2017]

The table below is comparison of rainfalls for between Agumbe in Thirthahalli taluk in Shimoga district, Hulikal in Hosanagara taluk in Shimoga district, Amagaon in Khanapur Taluk in Belgaum district and Talacauvery in Madikeri taluk in Kodagu district, Kokalli of Sirsi Taluk, Nilkund of Siddapur Taluk, CastleRock of Supa (Joida) Taluk in Uttara Kannada District to show which one can be called the "Cherapunji of South India".

See also
 Coastal Karnataka
 North Karnataka
 South Karnataka

References

External links
 Elephant attacks spread fear in Malnad region
 Nyctibatrachus major in Malnad, India
 Malenadu Region of Karnataka

Regions of Karnataka